The 1995 European Tour, titled as the 1995 Volvo Tour for sponsorship reasons, was the 24th official season of golf tournaments known as the PGA European Tour.

The 1995 season marked the start of co-sanctioning arrangements with other tours, with the addition of the Southern Africa Tour's South African PGA Championship to the European Tour schedule. The season was ultimately made up of 36 tournaments counting for the Order of Merit, and several non-counting "Approved Special Events".

The Order of Merit was won by Scotland's Colin Montgomerie, who completed a hat-trick of titles having also topped the money list in 1993 and 1994.

Changes for 1995
There were few changes from the previous season, with the addition of the South African PGA Championship, and the loss of the Open V33 Grand Lyon and the Belgian Open. In addition, the Extremadura Open was originally scheduled but later cancelled.

Schedule
The following table lists official events during the 1995 season.

Unofficial events
The following events were sanctioned by the European Tour, but did not carry official money, nor were wins official.

Order of Merit
The Order of Merit was titled as the Volvo Order of Merit and was based on prize money won during the season, calculated in Pound sterling.

Awards

See also
List of golfers with most European Tour wins

Notes

References

External links
1995 season results on the PGA European Tour website
1995 Order of Merit on the PGA European Tour website

European Tour seasons
European Tour